AlternC is a set of open-source Web Hosting server management software for Linux/UNIX-like systems, whose aim is to promote self hosting by individuals or small structures, and provide its users with an easy web-based interface to manage a web and mail server (and other Internet-based services).

Its main specificity is to provide its users with a non-technical web interface so that anybody can, without specific knowledge, host some web services. It also has some advanced options so that technical-savvy users can still fine-tune it.

It also features documentation in French and English.

History 
In 2000, the French free hosting provider Altern.org stopped its service after a complaint and a trial against Estelle Hallyday, effectively cutting down 47634 websites. Later, Valentin Lacambre gave his hosting control panel as free software, hoping that people will take it and be more independent of big hosting structures as his, in favor of free speech and alternative hosting.

In May 2001, Valentin's source code was abandoned and a rewrite started by the technical team at l’Autre Net (a non-profit hosting provider organized in as self-managed association), which gave birth to AlternC, which wanted to follow the same guidelines as Valentin's panel (mostly on usability and design).

As of today, some non-profit hosting providers are using and developing that software suite: Lautre Net, the founder of that project, but also Globenet, and other structures in Belgium, Québec and Africa.

Some professional web hosting companies are also using AlternC and participate actively to the code, such as Octopuce, Neuronnexion and Webelys.

A poll from 2010 estimated that at least 110 servers were running AlternC, having a total of 3500 accounts, hosting more than 9500 domain names, and 25000 POP/IMAP email accounts, with 2200 domain names and around thousand users from l’Autre Net, (this poll was only counting people actively helping the project)

This project is still actively developed.

Version numbering 
After a long series of 0.9.preXX and 0.9.x versions, version 1.0 was published in June 2011, with a new web interface design, more current and usable. A paperback book, in French, was also published at that time, effectively making 2011 a milestone in this software history.

The next version, released in February 2013, was version 3.0, mainly because some plugins were on different version numbers, and the development team wanted to make them coherent with the main software version (the Mailman plugin was version 2.1 already). Many new features and bugfixes where present in that version. The most notable one was the migration from Courier to Dovecot for the email service, and the separation, for security reasons, of all web hosting services using distincts Unix user accounts, thanks to the ITK module of the Apache HTTP Server.

The latest versions of AlternC are:

3.1.10 (for Squeeze) / 3.2.10 (for Wheezy) / 3.3.10 (for Jessie) released on January 18, 2016
3.1.9 (for Squeeze) / 3.2.9 (for Wheezy) released on November 17, 2015
3.1.8 (for Squeeze) / 3.2.8 (for Wheezy) released on August 3, 2015

Features 
 Domain name management
 DNS management
 Subdomain creation
 User account management
 Website and Web application hosting
 Email hosting
 Mailing list hosting
 Online file manager
 Security of the files and configuration
 Website statistics

AlternC is based on Debian Linux, and is using the standard Debian packages, therefore it can be used with the same level of security as Debian, and its standard configuration tools. This allows a system administrator to manage a server with AlternC and other services in the same machine.

See also

Bibliography

Other Articles 
 cPanel
 DirectAdmin
 Domain Technologie Control
 Hosting Controller
 ISPConfig
 Kloxo
 Plesk
 Webmin

References

External links 
  
 Online Help 
 The developers' corner (bug reports, milestones management, wiki pages etc.) 
 A demonstration server 
 Article on AlternC at Framasoft 
 ניהול אתרים

Web server management software
Unix Internet software
Free software
Web hosting
Linux software